Paula Elaine Cohen is a British-American geneticist who is a professor and Associate Vice Provost for Life Sciences at Cornell University. Her research considers DNA repair mechanisms and the regulation of crossing over during mammalian meiosis. She was awarded the National Down Syndrome Society Charles J. Epstein Down Syndrome Research Award in 2004 and elected Fellow of the American Association for the Advancement of Science in 2021.

Early life and education 
Cohen was born and raised in Nigeria. She attended boarding school in England from the age of 8 and then her family moved back to their native England when she was 11 years old. Cohen was an undergraduate student at King's College London, where she majored in animal physiology. She was a doctoral researcher at the University of London, where she worked toward a PhD in reproductive physiology. During her doctorate she was based at Guy's and St Thomas' NHS Foundation Trust. Her research considered endocrine control during implantation. After earning her doctorate she moved to the United States, where she worked as a postdoctoral researcher at the Albert Einstein College of Medicine.

Research and career 
Cohen joined the faculty at Albert Einstein College of Medicine in 2000. Her early research considered gonadal function in males and females. Specifically, she worked on maternal mismatch repair proteins and how they impact Trisomy-21. Trisomy-21 is the abnormality in chromosomes that is responsible for Down syndrome. She moved to Cornell University in 2004, where she was made associate professor in 2007 and professor in 2013. She founded the Cornell Center for Reproductive Genomics in 2006, which seeks to promote research in reproductive health and fertility. She was appointed Associate Vice Provost for Life Sciences in 2018.

Cohen is interested in mammalian meiosis, gametogenesis and the role of a variety of DNA repair pathways in mediating meiosis. In particular, Cohen has studied the DNA mismatch repair (MMR) pathway, and described the major crossover pathway in mammalian meiosis. She has also studied the origins of male intertility and spermatogenesis. Specifically, Cohen is interested in the regulation of RNA during the formation of sperm.

Cohen is chair of the 2022 Gordon Research Conference Diverse and Conserved Molecular Mechanisms Preventing Aneuploidy During Gamete Production. The conference looks to explore meiosis, the cell division process that results in gametes for sexual reproduction.

Awards and honours 
 2004 National Down Syndrome Society Charles J. Epstein Down Syndrome Research Award
 2009 Provost's award for Distinguished Scholarship
 2017 SUNY Chancellor's award for Academic Excellence
 2022 Elected Fellow of the American Association for the Advancement of Science

Selected publications

References 

Year of birth missing (living people)
Living people
Alumni of the University of London
Alumni of King's College London
Cornell University faculty
Geneticists
British emigrants to the United States
21st-century British scientists